Timeline of telescopes, observatories, and observing technology.

Before the Common Era (BCE)

3500s BCE
 The earliest sundials known from the archaeological record are the obelisks from ancient Egyptian astronomy and Babylonian astronomy

1900s BCE
 Taosi Astronomical Observatory, Xiangfen County, Linfen City, Shanxi Province, China

1500s BCE
 Shadow clocks invented in ancient Egypt and Mesopotamia

600s BCE
 11th–7th century BCE, Zhou dynasty astronomical observatory (灵台) in today's Xian, China

200s BCE
 Thirteen Towers solar observatory, Chankillo, Peru

100s BCE
 220-206 BCE, Han dynasty astronomical observatory (灵台) in Chang'an and Luoyang. During East Han dynasty, astronomical observatory (灵台) built in Yanshi, Henan Province, China
 220-150 BCE, Astrolabe invented by Apollonius of Perga

Common Era (CE)

400s
 5th century – Observatory at Ujjain, India
 5th century – Surya Siddhanta written in India
 499 – Aryabhatiya written by Aryabhata

500s
 6th century – Various siddhantas compiled by Indian astronomers

600s
 c. 628 – Brahmasphutasiddhanta by Brahmagupta
 632–647 – Cheomseongdae observatory is built in the reign of Queen Seondeok at Gyeongju, then the capital of Silla (present day South Korea)
 618–1279 – Tang dynasty-Song dynasty, observatories built in Chang'an, Kaifeng, Hangzhou, China

700s
 700–77 – The first Zij treatise, Az-Zīj ‛alā Sinī al-‛Arab, written by Ibrahim al-Fazari and Muhammad al-Fazari
 700–96 – Brass astrolabe constructed by Muhammad al-Fazari based on Hellenistic sources
 c. 777 – Yaqūb ibn Tāriq wrote Az-Zij al-Mahlul min as-Sindhind li-Darajat Daraja based on Brahmagupta and Surya Siddhanta

800s
 9th century – quadrant invented by Muhammad ibn Mūsā al-Khwārizmī in 9th century Baghdad and is used for astronomical calculations
 800–33 – The first modern observatory research institute built in Baghdad, Iraq, by Arabic astronomers during time of Al-Mamun
 800–50 – Zij al-Sindhind written by Muhammad ibn Mūsā al-Khwārizmī (Algorismi)
 825–35 – Al-Shammisiyyah observatory by Habash al-Hasib al-Marwazi in Baghdad, Iraq
 869 – Mahodayapuram Observatory in Kerala, India, by Sankaranarayana

900s
 10th century – Large astrolabe of diameter 1.4 meters constructed by Ibn Yunus
 900–29 – Az-Zij as-Sabi written by Muhammad ibn Jābir al-Harrānī al-Battānī (Albatenius)
 994 – First sextant constructed in Ray, Iran, by Abu-Mahmud al-Khujandi. It was a very large mural sextant that achieved a high level of accuracy for astronomical measurements.

1000s
 1000 – Mokattam observatory in Egypt for Al-Hakim bi-Amr Allah
 1000 – Volvelle, an early paper analog computer, invented by Arabic physicians and improved by Abu Rayhan Biruni for use in astronomy.
 11th century – Planisphere invented by Biruni
 11th century – Universal latitude-independent astrolabe invented by Abū Ishāq Ibrāhīm al-Zarqālī (Arzachel)
 1015 – Equatorium invented by Arzachel in Al-Andalus
 1023 – Hamedan observatory in Persia
 c. 1030 – Treasury of Optics by Ibn al-Haytham (Alhazen) of Iraq and Egypt
 1074–92 – Malikshah Observatory at Isfahan used by Omar Khayyám
 1086 – Northern Song dynasty astronomical observatory

1100s
 1100–50 – Jabir ibn Aflah (Geber) (c. 1100–1150) invented the torquetum, an observational instrument and mechanical analog computer device
 1114–87 – Tables of Toledo based on Arzachel and published by Gerard of Cremona
 1115–16 – Sinjaric Tables written by al-Khazini
 1119–25 – Cairo al-Bataihi observatory for Al-Afdal Shahanshah
 cs. 1020 – Geared mechanical astrolabe invented by Ibn Samh

1200s
 1206 – Al-Jazari invented his largest astronomical clock, the "castle clock", which is considered to be the first programmable analog computer.
 1252–72 – Alfonsine tables recorded
 1259 – Maragheh observatory and library of Nasir al-Din al-Tusi built in Persia under Hulagu Khan
 c. 1270 – Terrace for Managing Heaven 26 observatory network of Guo Shoujing under Khubilai Khan
 1272 – Zij-i Ilkhani written by Nasir al-Din al-Tusi
 1276 – Dengfeng Star Observatory Platform, Gaocheng, Dengfeng City, Henan Province, China

1300s
 1371 – The idea of using hours of equal time length throughout the year in a sundial was the innovation of Ibn al-Shatir

1400s
 1400–29 – Khaqani Zij by Jamshīd al-Kāshī
 1417 – Speculum Planetarum by Simones de Selandia
 1420 – Samarkand observatory of Ulugh Beg
 1437 – Zij-i-Sultani written by Ulugh Beg
 1442 – Beijing Ancient Observatory in China
 1467–71 – Observatory at Oradea, Hungary for Matthias Corvinus
 1472 – The Nuremberg observatory of Regiomontanus and Bernhard Walther.

1500s
 1540 Apian Astronomicum Caesareum
 1560 – Kassel observatory under Landgrave Wilhelm IV of Hesse
 1574 – Taqi al-Din Muhammad ibn Ma'ruf describes a long-distance magnifying device in his Book of the Light of the Pupil of Vision and the Light of the Truth of the Sights, which may have possibly been an early rudimentary telescope.
 1575–80 – Constantinople Observatory of Taqi ad-Din under Sultan Murad III
 1576 – Royal Danish Astronomical Observatory Uraniborg at Hven by Tycho Brahe
 1577 – Constantinople observatory constructed for Taqi al-Din Muhammad ibn Ma'ruf
 1577–80 – Unbored Pearl, a Zij treatise by Taqi al-Din
 1577–80 – Taqi al-Din invents a mechanical astronomical clock that measures time in seconds, one of the most important innovations in 16th-century practical astronomy, as previous clocks were not accurate enough to be used for astronomical purposes.
 1577–80 – Taqi al-Din invents framed sextant
 1581 – Royal Danish Astronomical Observatory Stjerneborg at Hven by Tycho Brahe
 1589–90 – Celestial globe without seams invented in Mughal India by Ali Kashmiri ibn Luqman during Akbar the Great's reign.

1600s
 1600 – Prague observatory in Benátky nad Jizerou by Tycho Brahe
 1603 – Johann Bayer's Uranometria is published
 1608 – Hans Lippershey tries to patent an optical refracting telescope, the first recorded functional telescope
 1609 – Galileo Galilei builds his first optical refracting telescope
 1616 – Niccolò Zucchi experiments with a reflecting telescope
 1633 – Construction of Leiden University Observatory
 1641 – William Gascoigne invents telescope cross hairs
 1641 – Danzig/Gdansk observatory of Jan Hevelius
 1642  – Copenhagen University Royal observatory
 1661 – James Gregory proposes an optical reflecting telescope with parabolic mirrors
 1667 – Paris Observatory
 1668 – Isaac Newton constructs the first "practical" reflecting telescope, the Newtonian telescope
 1672 – Laurent Cassegrain designs the Cassegrain telescope
 1675 – Royal Greenwich Observatory of England
 1684 – Christiaan Huygens publishes "Astroscopia Compendiaria" in which he described the design of very long aerial telescopes

1700s
 1704 – First observatory at Cambridge University (based at Trinity College)
 1724 – Indian observatory of Sawai Jai Singh at Delhi
 1725 – St. Petersburg observatory at Royal Academy
 1732 – Indian observatories of Sawai Jai Singh at Varanasi, Ujjain, Mathura, Madras
 1733 – Chester Moore Hall invents the achromatic lens refracting telescope
 1734 – Indian observatory of Sawai Jai Singh at Jaipur
 1753 – Real Observatorio de Cádiz (Spain)
 1753 – Vilnius Observatory at Vilnius University, Lithuania
 1758 – John Dollond reinvents the achromatic lens
 1761 – Joseph-Nicolas Delisle 62 observing station network for observing the transit of Venus
 1769 – Short reflectors used at 63 station network for transit of Venus
 1774 – Vatican Observatory (Specola Vaticana), originally established as the Observatory of the Roman College. 
 1780  – Florence Specola observatory
 1789 – William Herschel finishes a 49-inch (1.2 m) optical reflecting telescope, located in Slough, England
 1798 – Real Observatorio de la Isla de Léon (actualmente Real Instituto y Observatorio de la Armada) (Spain)

1800s
1803 National Astronomical Observatory (Colombia), the first observatory in the Americas
1836 Swathithirunal opened Trivandrum observatory
Tracking errors in guiding the telescope during the long exposure made the photograph came out as an indistinct fuzzy spot
 1840 – John William Draper takes make a successful photographic image of the Moon, the first astronomical photograph
 1845 – Lord Rosse finishes the Birr Castle  optical reflecting telescope, located in Parsonstown, Ireland
 1849 – Santiago observatory set up by USA, later becomes Chilean National Observatory (now part of the University of Chile)
 1859 –  Kirchhoff and Bunsen develop spectroscopy
 1864 – Herschel's so-called GC (General Catalogue) of nebulae and star clusters published
 1868 –  Janssen and Lockyer discover Helium observing spectra of Sun
 1871 – German Astronomical Association organized network of 13 (later 16) observatories for stellar proper motion studies
 1863 – William Allen Miller and Sir William Huggins use the photographic wet collodion plate process to obtain the first ever photographic spectrogram of a star, Sirius and Capella.
 1872 – Henry Draper photographs a spectrum of Vega that shows absorption lines.
 1878 – Dreyer published a supplement to the GC of about 1000 new objects, the New General Catalogue
 1883 – Andrew Ainslie Common uses the photographic dry plate process and a 36-inch (91 cm) reflecting telescope in his backyard to record 60 minute exposures of the Orion nebula that for the first time showed stars too faint to be seen by the human eye.
 1887 –  Paris conference institutes Carte du Ciel project to map entire sky to 14th magnitude photographically
 1888 –  First light of 91cm refracting telescope at Lick Observatory, on Mount Hamilton near San Jose, California
 1889 –  Astronomical Society of the Pacific founded
 1890 – Albert A. Michelson proposes the stellar interferometer
 1892 – George Ellery Hale finishes a spectroheliograph, which allows the Sun to be photographed in the light of one element only
 1897 – Alvan Clark finishes the Yerkes  optical refracting telescope, located in Williams Bay, Wisconsin

1900s
 1902 – Dominion Observatory, Ottawa, Ontario, Canada established
 1904 – Observatories of the Carnegie Institution of Washington founded
 1907 – F.C. Brown and Joel Stebbins develop a selenium cell photometer at the University of Illinois Observatory.

1910s
 1912 – Joel Stebbins and Jakob Kunz begin to use a photometer using a photoelectric cell at the University of Illinois Observatory.
 1917 – Mount Wilson  optical reflecting telescope begins operation, located in Mount Wilson, California
 1918 – 1.8m Plaskett Telescope begins operation at the Dominion Astrophysical Observatory, Victoria, British Columbia, Canada
 1919 – International Astronomical Union (IAU) founded

1930s

 1930 – Bernard-Ferdinand Lyot invents the coronagraph
 1930 – Karl Jansky builds a 30-meter long rotating aerial radio telescope This was the first radio telescope.
 1933 – Bernard-Ferdinand Lyot invents the Lyot filter
 1934 – Bernhard Schmidt finishes the first  Schmidt optical reflecting telescope
 1936 – Palomar  Schmidt optical reflecting telescope begins operation, located in Palomar, California
 1937 – Grote Reber builds a  radio telescope

1940s

 1941 – Dmitri Dmitrievich Maksutov invents the Maksutov telescope which is adopted by major observatories in the Soviet Union and internationally. It is now also a popular design with amateur astronomers
 1946 – Martin Ryle and his group perform the first astronomical observations with a radio interferometer
 1947 – Bernard Lovell and his group complete the Jodrell Bank  non-steerable radio telescope
 1949 – Palomar  Schmidt optical reflecting telescope begins operation, located in Palomar, California
 1949 – Palomar  optical reflecting telescope (Hale telescope) begins regular operation, located in Palomar, California

1950s

 1953 – Luoxue Mountain Cosmic Rays Research Center, Yunnan Province, in China founded
 1954 – Earth rotation aperture synthesis suggested (see e.g. Christiansen and Warburton (1955))
 1956 – Dwingeloo Radio Observatory 25 m telescope completed, Dwingeloo, Netherlands
 1957 – Bernard Lovell and his group complete the Jodrell Bank 250-foot (75 m) steerable radio telescope (the Lovell Telescope)
 1957 – Peter Scheuer publishes his P(D) method for obtaining source counts of spatially unresolved sources
 1959 – Radio Observatory of the University of Chile, located at Maipú, Chile founded
 1959 – The 3C catalogue of radio sources is published (revised in 1962)
 1959 – The Shane  Telescope Opened at Lick Observatory

1960s

 1960 – Owens Valley 27-meter radio telescopes begin operation, located in Big Pine, California
 1961 – Parkes 64-metre radio telescope begins operation, located near Parkes, Australia
 1962 – European Southern Observatory (ESO) founded
 1962 –  Kitt Peak solar observatory founded
 1962 – Green Bank, West Virginia 90m radio telescope
 1962 – Orbiting Solar Observatory 1 satellite launched
 1963 – Arecibo 300-meter radio telescope begins operation, located in Arecibo, Puerto Rico
 1964 – Martin Ryle's  radio interferometer begins operation, located in Cambridge, England
 1965 – Owens Valley 40-meter radio telescope begins operation, located in Big Pine, California
 1967 – First VLBI images, with 183 km baseline
 1969 – Observations start at Big Bear Solar Observatory, located in Big Bear, California
 1969 – Las Campanas Observatory

1970s

 1970 – Cerro Tololo  optical reflecting telescope begins operation, located in Cerro Tololo, Chile
 1970 – Kitt Peak National Observatory  optical reflecting telescope begins operation, located near Tucson, Arizona
 1970 – Uhuru x-ray telescope satellite
 1970 – Antoine Labeyrie performs the first high-resolution optical speckle interferometry observations
 1970 – Westerbork Synthesis Radio Telescope completed, near Westerbork, Netherlands
 1972 – 100 m Effelsberg radio telescope inaugurated (Germany)
 1973 – UK Schmidt Telescope 1.2 metre optical reflecting telescope begins operation, located in Anglo-Australian Observatory near Coonabarabran, Australia
 1974 – Anglo-Australian Telescope  optical reflecting telescope begins operation, located in Anglo-Australian Observatory near Coonabarabran, Australia
 1975 – Gerald Smith, Frederick Landauer, and James Janesick use a CCD to observe Uranus, the first astronomical CCD observation
 1975 – Antoine Labeyrie builds the first two-telescope optical interferometer
 1976 – The 6-m BTA-6 (Bolshoi Teleskop Azimutalnyi or “Large Altazimuth Telescope”) goes into operation on Mt. Pashtukhov in the Russian Caucasus
 1978 – Multiple Mirror  equivalent optical/infrared reflecting telescope begins operation, located in Amado, Arizona
 1978 – International Ultraviolet Explorer (IUE) telescope satellite
 1978  – Einstein High Energy Astronomy Observatory x-ray telescope satellite
 1979 – UKIRT  infrared reflecting telescope begins operation, located at Mauna Kea Observatory, Hawaii
 1979 – Canada-France-Hawaii  optical reflecting telescope begins operation, located at Mauna Kea Observatory, Hawaii
 1979 – NASA Infrared Telescope Facility  infrared reflecting telescope begins operation, located at Mauna Kea, Hawaii

1980s

 1980 – Completion of construction of the VLA, located in Socorro, New Mexico
 1983 – Infrared Astronomical Satellite (IRAS) telescope
 1984 – IRAM 30-m telescope at Pico Veleta near Granada, Spain completed
 1987 – 15-m James Clerk Maxwell Telescope UK submillimetre telescope installed at Mauna Kea Observatory
 1987 – 5-m Swedish-ESO Submillimetre Telescope (SEST) installed at the ESO La Silla Observatory
 1988 – Australia Telescope Compact Array aperture synthesis radio telescope begins operation, located near Narrabri, Australia
 1989 – Cosmic Background Explorer (COBE) satellite

1990s
 1990 – Hubble 2.4m space Telescope launched, mirror found to be flawed
 1991 – Compton Gamma Ray Observatory satellite
 1993 – Keck 10-meter optical/infrared reflecting telescope begins operation, located at Mauna Kea, Hawaii
 1993 – Very Long Baseline Array of 10 dishes
 1995 – Cambridge Optical Aperture Synthesis Telescope (COAST)—the first very high resolution optical astronomical images (from aperture synthesis observations)
 1995 – Giant Metrewave Radio Telescope of thirty 45 m dishes at Pune
 1996 – Keck 2 10-meter optical/infrared reflecting telescope begins operation, located at Mauna Kea, Hawaii
 1997 – The Japanese HALCA satellite begins operations, producing first VLBI observations from space, 25,000 km maximum baseline
 1998 – First light at VLT1, the 8.2 m ESO telescope

2000s

 2001 – First light at the Keck Interferometer. Single-baseline operations begin in the near-infrared.
 2001 – First light at VLTI interferometry array. Operations on the interferometer start with single-baseline near-infrared observations with the 103 m baseline.
 2005 – First imaging with the VLTI using the AMBER optical aperture synthesis instrument and three VLT telescopes.
 2005 – First light at SALT, the largest optical telescope in the Southern Hemisphere, with a hexagonal primary mirror of 11.1 by 9.8 meters.
 2007 – First light at Gran Telescopio de Canarias (GTC), in Spain, the largest optical telescope in the world with an effective diameter of 10.4 meters.
 2021 — James Webb Space Telescope (JWST), was launched 25 December 2021 on an ESA Ariane 5 rocket from Kourou, French Guiana[10] and will succeed the Hubble Space Telescope as NASA's flagship mission in astrophysics.

Under Construction
 Iranian National Observatory 3.4 m (first light planned in 2020) 
Extremely Large Telescope (first light planned in 2027)

Planned

Public Telescope (PST), German project of astrofactum. Launch was planned for 2019, but the project's website is now defunct and no updates have been provided on the fate of the effort.
 Mid/late-2021 – Science first light of the Vera C. Rubin Observatory is anticipated for 2021 with full science operations to begin a year later.
Nancy Grace Roman Space Telescope, part of NASA's Exoplanet Exploration Program. Launch is tentatively scheduled for 2027.

See also
 Timeline of telescope technology
 List of largest optical telescopes historically
 Extremely large telescope

References

 
 
 
 

Telescopes, observatories, and observing technology
Telescopes, observatories, and observing technology
Astronomical observatories
Astronomical imaging
Observational astronomy
Telescopes